Opuntia oricola is a species of prickly pear cactus known by the common name chaparral prickly pear. It is native to southern California and Baja California, where it grows in coastal sage scrub and chaparral habitats.

Description
Opuntia oricola is a large treelike cactus often exceeding 2 meters in height. The branches are made up of rounded flat segments up to 25 centimeters long. It is covered in clusters of curved, yellowish spines usually around 2 centimeters long.

The flowers are yellow, sometimes orange-tinged. The spherical fruit is purplish red on the outside, whitish and juicy inside, and up to 6 centimeters long. It was common along the coasts and adjacent inland areas of California, but development has reduced its populations.

References

External links
Jepson Manual Treatment: Opuntia oricola
Opuntia oricola Photo gallery
Opuntia oricola photo gallery at Opuntia Web

oricola
Cacti of Mexico
Cacti of the United States
Flora of California
Flora of Baja California
Natural history of the California chaparral and woodlands
Natural history of the Channel Islands of California
Natural history of the Peninsular Ranges
Natural history of the Santa Monica Mountains
Natural history of the Transverse Ranges
Santa Ana Mountains